Deep Politics is the sixth studio album by American experimental rock band Grails, released on Temporary Residence Limited in 2011.

Track listing
All songs written by Grails, except Track 2, which is written by Bruno Nicolai.

Personnel

Grails
Emil Amos – Synthesizer, Piano, Guitar, Drums, Lap Steel Guitar, Vocals
Alex Hall – Electric Guitar, Sampler, Mellotron, Moog synthesizer
Zak Riles – Twelve String Guitar
William Slater – Bass, Synthesizer, Piano, Vocals
Ben Nugent – Drums
Randall Dunn - Strings
Ash Black Bufflo – Synthesizer

References

2011 albums
Grails (band) albums
Temporary Residence Limited albums